The Fighting Streak is a 1922 American silent Western film directed by Arthur Rosson and starring Tom Mix, Patsy Ruth Miller and Gerald Pring.

Cast
 Tom Mix as Andrew Lanning
 Patsy Ruth Miller as Ann Withero
 Gerald Pring as Charles Merchant
 Al Fremont as Jasper Lanning
 Sid Jordan as Bill Dozier 
 Bert Sprotte as Hal Dozier
 Bob Fleming as Chick Heath

References

External links
 

1922 films
1922 Western (genre) films
American black-and-white films
Fox Film films
Films directed by Arthur Rosson
Silent American Western (genre) films
1920s English-language films
1920s American films